Insomnia is a 1994 horror/fantasy novel by American writer Stephen King. It follows retired widower Ralph Roberts whose increasing insomnia allows him to perceive auras and other hidden things, leading him to join a conflict between the forces of the Purpose and the Random. Like It and Dreamcatcher, the story is set in the fictional town of Derry, Maine. It includes connections to other Stephen King stories, particularly his novel series The Dark Tower.

Plot 
The story is set in the fictional town of Derry, Maine. Retiree Ralph Roberts encounters his formerly good-natured acquaintance Ed Deepneau at the local airfield. Ed is aggressive and swearing obscenely at a driver he accuses of secretly transporting fetal tissue from abortions. Some months later, Ralph (now a widower) encounters Ed's wife Helen who has been badly beaten by her husband after having signed a pro-choice related petition. Months later, Helen leaves Ed and hides at a women's shelter. 

Ralph begins to suffer from sleep maintenance insomnia, waking earlier each night until he is barely able to sleep an hour each night. As his insomnia develops, Ralph begins to see things invisible and intangible to others: colorful manifestations of life-force surrounding people (auras), and diminutive white-coated beings he calls "little bald doctors," based on their appearance. He gradually concludes these are not hallucinations but genuine things present on a different level of reality. He realizes that Ed Deepneau also sees these things. Ralph's friend Lois Chasse admits to him that she too has recently begun seeing auras which she can interpret. 

Ralph and Lois encounter two bald doctors, calling themselves Clotho and Lachesis, who act with dignity and free people from life when it is "their time" to pass away. A third bald doctor, Atropos, is a crazed rogue who seems to delight in disrupting lives and prematurely ending them. Ralph and Lois learn that life is largely governed by "The Purpose" and "The Random," forces or entities which are not enemies so much as opposites. Ed Deepneau is one of a few very rare beings who is not assigned to either force and can, therefore, greatly change existence. Ralph and Lois learn of the "Crimson King," a shape-shifting higher-dimensional villain who feeds on fear and grief and craves chaos to rule over. The Crimson King has sent Atropos to manipulate Deepneau as part of a plan to upset the entire order of the universe. Unable to intervene directly, Clotho and Lachesis, agents of the Purpose, gave Ralph and Lois insomnia to help them perceive, gain, and even access other levels of reality so they can defeat Atropos. The benign bald doctors describe these levels as beams of a "skyscraper," and Ralph has a vision of The Dark Tower, a representation of the multiverse.

Well-known and controversial pro-choice activist Susan Day is due to talk at the Derry civic center. Lois and Ralph see the building shrouded by a black aura, signifying a dark future. The Crimson King has been provoking Ed's feelings regarding abortion, turning him into a violent and paranoid fanatic. With  a small plane containing C-4 explosives, Ed intends to make a kamikaze attack on the civic center during Susan Day's speech, killing her and everyone within. Lois and Ralph are resentful at being manipulated by outside forces but decide they must prevent the attack.

Allies of Ed Deepneau set fire to the shelter where Helen has been staying since leaving him. Ralph and Lois save the residents, then seek out Atropos. Ralph overcomes the malicious being, extracting a promise from Atropos that he will not interfere with him and Lois, knowing the little bald doctors are bound to their promises. Once released, Atropos torments Ralph with a vision of a car accident in the near future that will take the life of Helen's young daughter Natalie Deepneau. Her death will be retaliation for Atropos not being able to interfere with Ralph.

Ralph tells the benign bald doctors he will not stop Ed Deepneau unless they allow him to save Natalie Deepneau later, offering his own life for hers.  A higher level entity briefly manifests, causing awe in the Clotho and Lachesis as it declares that Ralph's terms are acceptable. He and Lois learn that "almost all of reality has stopped to watch the events unfolding," as the success or failure of Ed's attack could affect all of reality. The Crimson King's true target is not the speaker Susan Day, as they had imagined, but a boy from the local shelter who will be in the audience: Patrick Danville, a young artist prophesied to one day play an instrumental role in preserving The Dark Tower (and thus the multiverse) and aiding in the defeat of the Crimson King. The Crimson King has repeatedly tried to end the life of a "messiah" but in Derry, a place of convergence, this is now possible.

Ed Deepneau takes off in his plane and Ralph fights him on board. The Crimson King manifests to prevent him from interrupting Ed's mission, but Ralph succeeds in causing the plane to crash some distance away from the center, surviving by shifting himself to a higher plane of reality before impact. Returning to his proper place and reality, Ralph and Lois fall in love and get married, gradually forgetting their adventures with the little bald doctors. 

In an epilogue taking place some years later, Ralph again starts experiencing insomnia. He once again sees auras and eventually remembers his adventure and the promise to exchange his life for Natalie Deepneau's. He arrives in time to see the car from his vision appear and veer towards Natalie. Ralph pushes Natalie to safety, losing his own life in the process. He dies peacefully with Lois at his side as Clotho and Lachesis watch over him.

Connections to other Stephen King works 
Protagonist Ralph Roberts also appears as a character in King's book Bag of Bones.

The story mentions a historical serial killer, Raymond Andrew Joubert, a character from Stephen King's book Gerald's Game.

Lois mentions the nearby town of Ludlow, the setting of Stephen King's story Pet Sematary. Among the collected items Atropos has from people whose lives he has cut short, there is a shoe that belonged to Gage Creed, a character in Pet Sematary.

Clothos and Lachesis explain an interpretation of the multiverse as a "skyscraper" and Ralph has a vision of the Dark Tower. Patrick Danville appears again in Stephen King's Dark Tower series. The protagonist of that series, the gunslinger Roland Deschain, is briefly mentioned in narration and it is shown that Patrick has visions of him. Other members of the Deepneau family appear in the book series. Insomnia briefly features the appearance of a benevolent being called the Green Man, whose color and energy imply he may be connected to the god-like turtle being Maturin or the entity Gan, both of whom feature in the Dark Tower series. The Crimson King is a major foe in the same book series, though he actually made his first direct appearance in publication with the book Insomnia.

There are several connections to the novel It. Mike Hanlon, a character from It who becomes a librarian in Derry, makes a cameo. The book mentions local citizen Oscar "Butch" Bowers, who in the book It is a minor character and the abusive father of villain Henry Bowers. The storm that tears apart much of Derry after the defeat of the shape-shifting monster Pennywise is mentioned several times. The Crimson King shares several qualities with Pennywise; both characters possess shape-shifting abilities, both have the ability to take the form of one’s deepest fear, and both originated in a cosmic void between worlds sometimes known in King's literature as “the Macroverse, and in King’s Dark Tower series, the Todash Darkness, in a space It refers to only as the Deadlights”. In Insomnia, the Crimson King mentions to Ralph, “Actually, I can be whatever I want. You may not know it, but shape-changing is a time-honored custom in Derry.”, a nod to It's activities in the 1986 novel. This has led to speculation among fans that It and the Crimson King are one and the same, something that has never been confirmed or denied by King.

Nominations

Insomnia was nominated for a Bram Stoker Award for Best Novel in 1994.

References

1994 American novels
American horror novels
Novels about sleep disorders
Novels by Stephen King
Novels set in Maine
Viking Press books